United Nations Security Council resolution 623, adopted on 23 November 1988, the Council noted with grave concern the death sentence imposed upon anti-apartheid activist Paul Tefo Setlaba, on the basis of "common purpose" in South Africa. The resolution at the meeting urgently called by Zambia strongly urged the Government of South Africa to commute Setlaba's sentence and stay his execution in order to further avoid aggravating the situation in South Africa.

Resolution 623 was adopted by 13 votes to none, with two abstentions from the United Kingdom and the United States. Explaining their abstentions, both countries said that while they opposed apartheid and the repression in South Africa as a result of it, they could not vote for the current resolution as Setlaba had admitted he was involved in the murder of another South African during the 1985 black consumer boycott.

On 25 November 1988, four and a half hours before the execution was to be carried out, Setlaba was granted a reprieve.

See also
 Internal resistance to South African apartheid
 List of United Nations Security Council Resolutions 601 to 700 (1987–1991)
 South Africa under apartheid

References

External links
 
Text of the Resolution at undocs.org

 0623
1988 in South Africa
 0623
November 1988 events